John Edmund Califano (December 5, 1862 in Rome – June 15, 1946 in Van Nuys), was a student of Domenico Morelli. Califano became a landscape artist, especially noted for his scenes of California and Italy. In 1881, he came to the United States and lived in Chicago until 1908. By 1915, he was in San Francisco and spent the last years of his life in Van Nuys.

Califano exhibited in Naples, Italy in 1880, receiving a gold medal, as well as showing at the Art Institute of Chicago, in 1907; and the National Academy of Design, New York City, 1897–99.

References
Edan Milton Hughes, "Artists in California, 1786-1940"

1862 births
1946 deaths
19th-century American painters
American male painters
20th-century American painters
Italian emigrants to the United States
19th-century American male artists
20th-century American male artists